Anwesha Reddy (born 3 September 1991) is an Indian female squash player. She was a member of the Indian women's squash team which claimed bronze medal at the 2010 Asian Games though she was considered as a non participant during the team event.

Anwesha also represented India at the 2010 Commonwealth Games and competed in the women's singles. She also competed in the 2010 Women's World Team Squash Championships and achieved her career best ranking of 86 during the tournament. Anwesha Reddy has trained at the ICL-TNSRA squash academy which is situated in Chennai.

References 

1991 births
Living people
Indian female squash players
Asian Games medalists in squash
Asian Games bronze medalists for India
Squash players at the 2010 Asian Games
Medalists at the 2010 Asian Games
Commonwealth Games competitors for India
Squash players at the 2010 Commonwealth Games
21st-century Indian women
Sportswomen from Tamil Nadu
Racket sportspeople from Chennai
20th-century Indian women